Sanskriti School, Pune, India, is a day school established in 2005. It moved to its new  campus in 2008, located close to Chandni Chowk. Students are taught from pre-primary to standard XII.

The school was inaugurated by Abdul Kalam, the former president of India, and is affiliated to the Central Board of Secondary Education, New Delhi.

Infrastructure 
The school was founded by Devyani Mungali and Girija Shankar Mungali. It has a 14-acre campus, water purification and treatment plant, classrooms, chemistry laboratory,  biology laboratory, and physics laboratory. The school has a music room, an art room, an audiovisual room, and multipurpose rooms.

The school's campus has (as of February 2013) basketball court, volleyball court, international-size soccer ground, two badminton courts, table tennis tables as well as carom boards and chess boards. There is an auditorium above the main floor lobby. The basketball and volleyball courts were inaugurated by the Indian footballer Bhaichung Bhutia. The school is several floors tall, and is being expanded.

See also 
List of schools in Pune

References

External links 
 

Schools in Pune
2005 establishments in Maharashtra
Educational institutions established in 2005
Private schools in Maharashtra